FRI and College Area is a census town of Forest Research Institute, in Dehradun district of Uttarakhand, India.

Demographics
 India census, FRI and College Area had a population of 5428. Males constitute 53% of the population and females 47%. FRI and College Area has an average literacy rate of 81%, higher than the national average of 59.5%: male literacy is 84%, and female literacy is 77%. In FRI and College Area, 11% of the population is under 6 years of age.

Localities
Panditwari
Kaulagarh
Prem Nagar
indira Nagar
Mohit Nagar
Vasant Vihar
Engg.Enclave

References

Cities and towns in Dehradun district
Education in Dehradun
Geography of Dehradun